The following lists events that happened in 1969 in Libya.

Incumbents
Monarch: Idris (abdicated 8 September)
Prime Minister: Wanis al-Qaddafi (until 31 August), Mahmud Sulayman al-Maghribi (starting 8 September)

Events
 1 September. A young officer named Muammar Gaddafi led a coup that overthrew King Idris's monarchy.
 7 September. Mahmud Sulayman al-Maghribi is appointed prime minister.
 8 September. Gadaffi is appointed commander-in-chief of the Libyan Armed Forces.

1969–70 Libyan Premier League

 
Years of the 20th century in Libya
Libya
Libya
1960s in Libya